Retinol binding protein 1, cellular, also known as RBP1, is a protein that in humans is encoded by the RBP1 gene.

Function 

RBP1 is the carrier protein involved in the transport of retinol (vitamin A alcohol) from the liver storage site to peripheral tissue. Vitamin A is a fat-soluble vitamin necessary for growth, reproduction, differentiation of epithelial tissues, and vision. The gene harbors four exons encoding 24, 59, 33, and 16 amino acid residues, respectively. The second intervening sequence alone occupies 19 kb of the 21 kb of the gene.

Clinical significance 

Cellular retinol-binding protein-1 (CRBP-1) contributes to the maintenance of the differentiative state of endometrial cells through the regulation of bioavailability of retinol.  On the converse, loss of CRBP-1 is associated with development of endometrial cancer.

References

Further reading

Lipocalins